Pennocrucium was a Romano-British settlement and military complex located at present day Water Eaton, just south of Penkridge, Staffordshire, with evidence of occupation from the mid-1st century until the 4th century.

The settlement was mentioned in the 2nd century Antonine Itinerary, which described it as lying 12 miles from Uxacona (near present-day Oakengates) and 12 miles from Letocetum (Wall, near Lichfield). The exact site of Pennocrucium was identified only after aerial photography revealed cropmarks in 1946, and excavations were conducted by Kenneth St Joseph over subsequent years.

Pennocrucium was an important road junction on Watling Street – the main Roman road across the Midlands to Viroconium Cornoviorum (Wroxeter) – and was situated 700 metres east of its crossing of the River Penk, with roads leading north to Mediolanum (Whitchurch) and south in the direction of Greensforge near Kinver and Metchley Fort in Birmingham.

Five single-ditched enclosures in the vicinity have been identified as temporary marching camps.

References

History of Staffordshire
Roman towns and cities in England
Former populated places in Staffordshire
Penkridge